Sporozoid may refer to a
 zoospore: The term sporozoid was formerly used in botany in this context.
 sporozoan (sporozoid protozoan), a member of the Sporozoa (now Apicomplexa, protists).

 See also
 sporozoite, a stage in the apicomplexan life cycle